Emma Ping Lum (1910-1989) was the first Chinese American female lawyer in the United States and California.

Early life 
Lum was born on August 10, 1910 to Walter U. Lum and Gum Young Lee. She was one of seven children. Her father Walter was a prominent figure in Chinatown, San Francisco. He founded the newspaper Chinese Times in 1924, and launched various political efforts to abolish the Expatriation Act of 1907 and the Chinese Exclusion Act.

Education 
Lum earned her A.B. from San Francisco State College in 1934 and an M.A. from Columbia University in 1943. Lum was fluent in various Chinese dialects, and applied those skills while working in San Francisco's Office of Censorship, earning a certificate of merit for her service, during World War II.

In 1947, Lum graduated from UC Hastings College of the Law and became a member of the State Bar of California.  In 1952, she was the first Chinese American female to practice before the United States Supreme Court. By 1966, she had long established her legal practice at 745 Grant Avenue in San Francisco. Her affiliations included the California State Bar Association, San Francisco Bar Association, the Queen’s Bench, and the Kappa Beta Phi legal sorority.

Death 
Lum died in May 1989.

See also 

 List of first women lawyers and judges in the United States
 List of first women lawyers and judges in California

References 

American jurists of Chinese descent
California lawyers
San Francisco State University alumni
Columbia University alumni
20th-century American lawyers
1910 births
1989 deaths
20th-century American women lawyers